Michael Anthony Tucker (born June 25, 1971) is a former Major League Baseball outfielder and first baseman. Tucker played with the Kansas City Royals (-, -), Atlanta Braves (-), Cincinnati Reds (-), Chicago Cubs (2001), San Francisco Giants (-), Philadelphia Phillies (2005) and New York Mets. He batted left-handed and threw right-handed.

Early career
He attended the then Longwood College (at the time an NCAA Division II school) from 1989 through 1992. In November 2005, Tucker was among the selection of Longwood's first Hall of Fame class, including basketball player Jerome Kersey and LPGA golfer Tina Barrett.

Tucker spent most of the 1993 season with the Single-A Carolina League Wilmington Blue Rocks. Before making the move up to Double-A and spending time with the Memphis Chicks of the Southern League. In , Tucker played in Triple-A with the Omaha Royals of the American Association before joining Major League Baseball and the Kansas City Royals.

Major League career
Tucker made his Major League debut for the Royals at age 23 on April 26, 1995. Starting in left field and batting leadoff, Tucker singled in his first big-league at-bat against pitcher Mike Mussina in a 5-1 win over the Baltimore Orioles. Before the 1997 season, Tucker was traded to the Braves along with Keith Lockhart in exchange for outfielder Jermaine Dye and pitcher Jamie Walker.

Tucker enjoyed his most productive season in 1997 with the Braves, when he posted career highs in batting average (.283), runs (80) and hits (141) in 138 games. In 2004, for the Giants, he played 106 games in right field and 25 in center. He ended the year with a .256 average, 13 home runs, 62 RBI, 77 runs, and a .340 on-base percentage. Tucker hit the first regular season home run at Turner Field off Kevin Foster in the third inning of the Braves' 5-4 victory over the Chicago Cubs on April 4, 1997.

In August 2005, San Francisco traded Tucker to the Philadelphia Phillies for minor leaguer Kelvin Pichardo. Tucker, whose playing time had been limited that season after starting for most of 2004, joined a Phillies team in the heart of the playoff chase.

On January 9, 2006, Tucker agreed to a one-year contract with the Washington Nationals. On August 9, Tucker's contract was purchased by the New York Mets from the Triple-A Norfolk Tides after Cliff Floyd was placed on the 15-Day DL. On May 17, Tucker signed a minor league contract with the Boston Red Sox, but was released on July 7 of the same year.

Tucker was basically a streaky line drive hitter with gap power whose struggles against left-handed pitching made him a platoon player throughout his career. Although his 108 stolen bases career total doesn't show it, he was an aggressive and smart base runner. In the field, Tucker had the ability to play all outfield positions well, particularly in right field. He had good range and a strong and accurate arm.

Return to pro baseball
In 2009, Tucker came back to baseball by signing with the Newark Bears of the Atlantic League. He was inactivated, after playing 12 games hitting .231 and considered retirement in May 2009. But Tucker signed with the Southern Maryland Blue Crabs on July 15, 2009 and, in 57 games, he hit .332.

References

External links

1971 births
Living people
Atlanta Braves players
Chicago Cubs players
Cincinnati Reds players
Kansas City Royals players
Philadelphia Phillies players
San Francisco Giants players
New York Mets players
Major League Baseball right fielders
Baseball players from Virginia
African-American baseball players
Wilmington Blue Rocks players
Memphis Chicks players
Omaha Royals players
Wichita Wranglers players
Norfolk Tides players
Pawtucket Red Sox players
Newark Bears players
Southern Maryland Blue Crabs players
Olympic baseball players of the United States
Baseball players at the 1992 Summer Olympics
Longwood Lancers baseball players
People from South Boston, Virginia
21st-century African-American sportspeople
20th-century African-American sportspeople